The 2020–21 season was the 73rd season in the existence of 1. FC Köln and the club's second consecutive season in the top flight of German football. In addition to the domestic league, 1. FC Köln participated in this season's edition of the DFB-Pokal. The season covered the period from 1 July 2020 to 30 June 2021.

Players

First-team squad

Players out on loan

Transfers

In

Out

Pre-season and friendlies

Competitions

Overview

Bundesliga

League table

Results summary

Results by round

Matches
The league fixtures were announced on 7 August 2020.

Relegation play-offs
As a result of their 16th-place finish in the regular season, the club qualified for the play-off match with the third-place team in the 2020–21 2. Bundesliga to determine whether the club would remain in the 2021–22 Bundesliga.

DFB-Pokal

Statistics

Appearances and goals

|-
! colspan=14 style=background:#dcdcdc; text-align:center| Goalkeepers

|-
! colspan=14 style=background:#dcdcdc; text-align:center| Defenders

|-
! colspan=14 style=background:#dcdcdc; text-align:center| Midfielders
 

 

 

|-
! colspan=14 style=background:#dcdcdc; text-align:center| Forwards

|-
! colspan=14 style=background:#dcdcdc; text-align:center| Players transferred out during the season

Goalscorers

Last updated: 29 May 2021

References

External links

1. FC Köln seasons
Köln